Ambai Arts College, is a general degree college located in Ambasamudram, Tirunelveli district, Tamil Nadu. It was established in the year 1969. The college is affiliated with Manonmaniam Sundaranar University. This college offers different courses in arts and commerce.

Accreditation
The college is  recognized by the University Grants Commission (UGC).

References

Educational institutions established in 1969
1969 establishments in Tamil Nadu
Colleges affiliated to Manonmaniam Sundaranar University
Universities and colleges in Tirunelveli district